Andrew Kittredge Lewis (August 5, 1925 – February 28, 2018) was an American screenwriter. He was nominated for an Academy Award in the category Best Original Screenplay for the film Klute. 

Lewis died in February 2018 of natural causes at his home in Walpole, New Hampshire, at the age of 92.

Selected filmography 
 Klute (1971; co-nominated with David E. Lewis)

References

External links 

1925 births
2018 deaths
People from Lexington, Massachusetts
American male screenwriters
American television writers
American male television writers
Screenwriters from Massachusetts
20th-century American male writers